The Mardi Gras Stakes is an American Thoroughbred horse race run annually since 1922 at Fair Grounds Race Course in New Orleans, Louisiana. 

Run in February, the race is open to fillies and mares, aged four and up, and run on turf since 2016 at a distance of about  furlongs over the Stall-Wilson Turf Course.

Winners since 2007

References

Fair Grounds Race Course
Flat horse races for four-year-old fillies
Horse races in New Orleans
Turf races in the United States
Horse racing
Recurring sporting events established in 1922
1922 establishments in Louisiana